Delta Reticuli (Delta Ret, δ Reticuli, δ Ret) is a star in the southern constellation of Reticulum. It is visible to the naked eye, having an apparent visual magnitude of 4.60. The distance to this star, as estimated from its annual parallax shift of 6.20 mas, is roughly 530 light-years from the Sun.

This is an evolved red giant star on the asymptotic giant branch, having a stellar classification of M2 III. It has expanded to around 56 times the radius of the Sun and radiates 1,100 times the solar luminosity from its cool outer atmosphere at an effective temperature of 3,891 K.

Delta Reticuli is moving through the Milky Way at a speed of 13.3 km/s relative to the Sun. Its projected galactic orbit carries it between 22,700 and 30,400 light-years from the center of the galaxy.

References

M-type giants
Asymptotic-giant-branch stars
Reticulum (constellation)
Reticuli, Delta
Durchmusterung objects
025422
018597
1247